St. Andrew's Episcopal School is a coeducational college preparatory independent school for preschool, beginning at age two, through grade twelve. St. Andrew's is located at 8804 Postoak Road, Potomac, Maryland, in Montgomery County. As of 2022-2023, total enrollment is 704. The student to faculty ratio is 7:1.

Academics
The school operates on trimesters. Students in grades 6–12 attend on average four classes per day. Upper School and Middle School students take five major academic courses per year – English, History, Language, Mathematics, and Science. Religion, art (visual and performing) and athletics are required at least one trimester per year.

In 2011, the school founded The Center for Transformative Teaching and Learning (CTTL), a professional development program for its faculty which develops's the school's curriculum. The Chan Zuckerberg Initiative contributed $1 million to this effort.

Begun in 1998, the Oral History project, the signature academic program in the Upper School, houses one of the largest pre-collegiate collection of oral histories in North America.

The school is a member of College Entrance Examination Board, Cum Laude Society, National Association of College Admissions Counseling, National Association of Independent Schools, National Association of Episcopal Schools, and Potomac & Chesapeake Association of College Admissions Counseling. It is fully accredited by the Association of Independent Maryland Schools, Maryland State Department of Education, and Middle States Association of Colleges and Schools. Advanced Placement classes are available in fourteen disciplines.

In April 2020, the school was among the dozens in the Washington, D.C., area which met the legal criteria for and received an unspecified amount in federally backed small business loans as part of the Paycheck Protection Program. The school received scrutiny over this loan, which was meant to protect small and private businesses.

Campus

Postoak
It serves age 2 to grade 12. The Postoak campus was originally Clagett Farm and later the campus of Harker Preparatory School. The original farmhouse, constructed in 1810, was preserved and renamed Kiplinger House. It is home to the Admission, Advancement, and Business Officers. MacDonald Hall, a multi-purpose theater/assembly/lunch space, features a stage and light/sound booth and seating for approximately 400. In the Main Building, there are classrooms, laboratories, two studios for the visual arts, including ceramics wheels and a kiln, and a darkroom. The two libraries (Lower and Middle/Upper) hold 20,000 volumes and two design labs offer makerspace with tools including a laser cutter, 3D printer, and router.

In September 2016, a  Student Center opened. The facility contains two gyms, a fitness center, a dance studio, student commons, and a café. In fall of 2019, a new Lower School building opened serving students age 2 through fifth grade, bringing all St. Andrew's students to one campus.

Two athletic fields with all-weather synthetic FieldTurf are used for softball, baseball, lacrosse and soccer. They were resurfaced in the summer of 2020 and dugouts were added for softball and baseball, along with new scoreboards for both Hope Field and Brumbaugh Field.

Past campuses
The school currently has one campus. It previously operated a lower school on River Road. Its original home (1978–1979) was Pilgrim Lutheran Church before moving to the Clara Barton School (1979-1981) and then North Bethesda Junior High, known as the Bradmoor Campus (1981–1998).

Demographics
In 2022-2023, 11% of the students were of the Episcopal faith, 14% were Catholic and 29% belonged to another Christian faith. 13% were Jewish and 6% were multi-faith. 47% of the students were students of color.

Athletics
Students can choose to participate in varsity and junior varsity sports as well as several non-competitive physical education options. The school fields 52 interscholastic teams, including 19 Middle School teams and 33 JV and varsity teams, in 14 different sports. More than 250 Upper School students participate on these teams, with several students participating in two or three seasons.

St. Andrew's has interscholastic teams in soccer, volleyball, cross country, basketball, wrestling, baseball, softball, lacrosse, tennis, golf, indoor track, equestrian, swimming and track and field. St. Andrew's also offers fitness, dance and other non-competitive athletic options.

The girls' varsity teams compete in the Independent School League (ISL), and the boys' varsity teams compete in the Mid-Atlantic Athletic Conference (MAC).

Arts
St. Andrew's has an arts program that is integrated throughout the preschool through grade 12 curricula. Upper and Middle School students can take part in musicals, plays, jazz band, symphonic rock orchestra, chorus, a capella, dance concerts, art assemblies, physical performance skills, improvisation and a talent show. Visual artists can take ceramics, studio art, advanced art and portfolio development, digital design, drawing, painting and photography. In 2018 the school won awards at the Music in the Parks competition and one student won the National Science Foundation's Generation Nano art competition. The school has produced award-winning performers including comedienne Whitney Cummings and Tony Award-winning playwright Steven Levenson (“Dear Evan Hansen”).

Extra-curricular

Trips
Each year, students from all grades make use of the cultural and historical resources of the greater Washington, D.C., area.  The 6th, 7th and 8th graders participate in fall trips to such places as the Chesapeake Bay, Camp Varsity, Calleva and Horizon. Upper School sports teams often travel during the fall preseason, Winter Break, and Spring Break.

Every year there are opportunities for trips abroad through different academic departments. St. Andrew's has long-standing partnerships with the Bokamoso Youth Centre in Winterveld, South Africa and is a partner school with Christ Roi School in Civol, Haiti. Students in the Upper School have the opportunity to travel there every year on service learning trips. Upper School students also have other travel opportunities, such as Egypt, Spain, Colombia and Chicago. The Middle School also offers trips from time to time during spring break. In 2017, Middle School students had the opportunity to visit Hawaii.

Clubs
Each week there is a designated period during the school day when students can participate in clubs of their choice. Clubs are run by students and in 2019, there were more than eighty club offerings.

Notable alumni and students
 Pierre Omidyar, founder of eBay and philanthropist with Omidyar Network.
 Whitney Cummings, actress, comedian, author, and co-creator of 2 Broke Girls sitcom.
 Melissa d'Arabian, Food network personality, cook, author.
 Steven Levenson, Tony Award-winner for Best Book of a Musical for "Dear Evan Hansen".
 Kate Siegel, actress and screenwriter.
 Barron Trump, son of 45th President of the United States Donald Trump.
 Nitya Vidyasagar, actress

References

External links
 
History of the School - St. Andrew's Archives

Private K-12 schools in Montgomery County, Maryland
Educational institutions established in 1978
1978 establishments in Maryland
Episcopal schools in Maryland
Schools in Potomac, Maryland